Ngawn or Ngawn Chin is a Kuki-Chin language spoken in Falam District, Chin State, and Kale District, Sagaing Region, Burma. There are 27 Ngawn villages in Falam township, Chin State. 

Some Ngawn people also live in Tonzang Township, Chin State and Kalay, Kabaw, Sagaing Region.

Examples 

Those villages are located in (Hualngo area and Zanniat area), Falam Township, Chin State. And those villages are founded by Ngawn people. Zawlpi village is a new one they founded in 2016 officially.

 

Ngawn People Have Some Organizations

References

Kuki-Chin languages